Antoine-Charles-Louis, Comte de Lasalle (10 May 1775, Metz6 July 1809, Wagram) was a French cavalry general during the Revolutionary and Napoleonic Wars, often called "The Hussar General". He first gained fame for his role in the Capitulation of Stettin. Over the course of his short career, he became known as a daring adventurer and was credited with many exploits. Eventually, he fought on every front and was killed at the Battle of Wagram.

Early career

Antoine Lasalle was born on 10 May 1775 in Metz, Lorraine province, into a family of minor nobility. His father was Pierre Nicolas de Lasalle d’Augny, an officer in the French Royal Army and a knight of the Order of Saint Louis, and his mother was Suzanne Dupuy de la Gaule. On his maternal side, Lasalle was a descendant of Abraham de Fabert, a Marshal of France. His military inclinations showed at an early age and, thanks to his family's status, when he was eleven years old he was able to join the Foreign Infantry Regiment of Alsace (German) as a second lieutenant replacement on 19 June 1786, rising to the rank of second lieutenant by the age of fourteen.

When the French Revolution broke out, Lasalle embraced it and was assigned as a second lieutenant to the 24th Cavalry Regiment on 25 May 1791. Being an officer in the French Army had always been a privilege of the nobility, but this was reversed by a government decree in 1792, to the point of forbidding people of aristocratic origins to have military command. As result, he lost his commission but he remained loyal to France. The incident did not deter his desire for a military career, so he enlisted as a private in 1792 and moved to Paris.

He joined the Section des Piques, a group of radical Parisian revolutionaries in the National Guard. By 1793, he had joined the Army of the North in Italy as a volunteer in the 23rd Horse Chasseur Regiment. He was soon elected sergeant and led his company to attack and capture an enemy artillery battery. The general in command witnessed the fearlessness that Lasalle had demonstrated, and proposed that he be made an officer. Lasalle rejected this because it would separate him from his men.

The Army of Italy
Through family friendship with François Christophe Kellermann, he won back his pre-Revolutionary grade of lieutenant and became Kellermann's aide-de-camp on 10 March 1795. Enjoying the challenges of staff work, he stayed with Kellermann when he transferred to the Army of Italy on 6 May 1795. He was employed as assistant to Kellermann's son, Adjutant-General François Étienne de Kellermann in May, 1796. Lasalle was soon promoted to Captain on 7 November, the same year.

Battle of Rivoli

He justified his rapid progress and reputation when, at the Battle of Rivoli, he spurred ahead with the entire cavalry26 horsemen of the 22nd Horse Chasseurs. A battery of 15 French guns blasted the Austrian dragoons, while two columns of infantry were led forward supported by cavalry under Charles Leclerc and Lasalle. The packed Austrian soldiers in the gorge fled when their own dragoons began trampling on them in panic. As a result, an entire battalion of the Deutschmeister Regiment threw down its arms in panic and fled. Likewise, the dispersed infantry on the Trambasore Heights were unable to hold once Lasalle and the French cavalry got in their midst. Lasalle and his men continued to support Generals Lebley and Vial until the battle was over. There were 5,000 French casualties and 14,000 Austrian casualties. Eleven flags were captured, five of which were captured by Lasalle. After the battle, all of the trophies were piled up before Napoleon and Lasalle lay exhausted a few feet away on top of his five flags. Napoleon said, "Go to sleep on your flags, Lasalle, for it was well-deserved!”

With 16 men from the new Corps of Guides, Lasalle charged the enemy's Uhlans, forcing them to evacuate the city and retreat to the Tagliamento. Lasalle was the first to cross the river in pursuit of them. Lasalle and his men successfully drove the enemy out of the Tagliamento, ending the campaign in Italy with an overwhelming French Victory.

The invasion of Egypt
Napoleon Bonaparte personally asked Lasalle to participate in the Campaign in Egypt. Excited about participating in this exotic expedition, he joined the Army of the East. They invaded Alexandria and from there marched to Cairo. On 21 July 1798, in the Battle of the Pyramids, the Turks, reassured by the easy refuge the village of Embabeh provided for them, resisted the efforts of the French Army. Lasalle, at the head of 60 men, charged the village and routed the garrison, chasing them wildly. He cut off the retreating army by taking a secret route through the Giza Pyramids, allowing Napoleon to crush his opponents. Because of this bold move, Napoleon promoted Lasalle to Lieutenant Colonel of the 22nd Horse Chasseur Brigade and 7th Hussars.

He traveled back to the Nile with General Louis Desaix and fought at the Battle of Salahieh on 11 August. While battling and besting a group of Mamelukes, the cord that attached his sabre to his wrist snapped, leaving the sabre on the ground. He calmly dismounted and picked it up in the middle of the fray, quietly mounted his horse and continued fighting. This fearlessness made him a popular companion for risky missions.

Major battles
Two weeks later at the Battle of Remedieh, he chopped both hands off a Mameluke who was fighting General Davout, saving his life. He then overthrew several Mamelukes, broke his sword over the head of Osman Bey, broke a pair of pistols while defending himself, took the sword of a wounded dragoon, returned to the mêlée, rallied his troops, restored the fight, and drove the enemy to the desert. On 22 January, at the Battle of Samanhout, he executed some brilliant cavalry charges that led considerable losses for the enemy. Finally on 1 March 1799, at the Battle of Gehemi, he completely defeated a regiment of Arabs who had come from Yanbu' al Bahr to help the Mamelukes, and killed over 300 men. Lasalle continued to follow his regiment and played a major role in General Desaix's subjugation of Upper Egypt against Murad Bey.

The 22nd Horse Chasseurs returned to Cairo after the victory and were tasked to contain Egypt and to ensure communications between Salahieh and Cairo. Lasalle successfully completed this mission. After the signing of the Convention of El-Arish on 24 January 1800, Lasalle returned home to France. To advertise his recent adventures, he adopted the Mamelukes' baggy red trousers (saroual) as part of his uniform. On 5 August, after his return, he received pistols and a Sabre of Honour from Napoleon. On 25 August of the same year he received the command of the 10th Hussars as Colonel or chef de brigade.

Interlude in France

He was one of the best commanders of light cavalry, as well as being intelligent, well-educated, and witty; yet, according to Divisional General Jean-Antoine Marbot, he posed as a libertine and ruffian who "might always be seen drinking, swearing, and smashing everything", carefully maintaining the hussar image and reputation. He also founded the "Society of Alcoholics", which shocked the high society of Paris (except for Napoleon). One evening Lasalle made Paul Thiébault count all the empty wine bottles. Thiébault asked "Do you want to kill yourself?” which prompted the famous reply from Lasalle: "My friend, any hussar who does not die by thirty is a blackguard..."

Affair and marriage
Lasalle had been intimately connected with Joséphine Berthier, the wife of General Victor Leopold Berthier (Minister of War and Chief of Staff) and sister-in-law to Marshal Louis-Alexandre Berthier. Joséphine and Berthier divorced and Lasalle immediately proposed to her. Napoleon gave Lasalle 200,000 francs towards the nuptials. When they met at the Tuileries Palace, Napoleon asked, "When is the wedding?” Lasalle replied, "Sire, when I have enough money to buy the wedding presents and furniture". Napoleon said, "But I gave you 200,000 francs last week, what did you do with them?". Lasalle replied, "I used half to pay my debts and have lost the rest gambling". Such a confession would have broken the career of any other soldier but, coming from Lasalle, it made the Emperor smile. Napoleon merely ordered his Grand Marshal of the Palace, and aide, General Géraud Duroc to give Lasalle another 200,000 francs. When a prefect asked why Napoleon didn't discipline Lasalle for his conduct, Napoleon responded that "It only takes a stroke of a pen to create a prefect, but it takes twenty years to make a Lasalle".

Despite this extravagance, Lasalle apparently possessed a sense of duty and responsibility towards his new family and cared for Berthier's three boys, Alméric-Alexandre (b. 1797), Oscar (b. 1799), and Alexandre-Joseph (b. 1802) as if they were his own. (In fact, Alméric-Alexandre and Oscar probably were his illegitimate sons. He and Joséphine had their own little girl, Charlotte-Joséphine, who was born in May, 1806.) On 14 June 1804 he was made a member of law in the 5th Cohort of the Legion of Honour as a Commander. He took up his post in Salamanca, Spain later that year.

Duelling and boredom in Spain
Shortly after his arrival in Spain, Lasalle found himself involved in a duel by sabre. He had been attempting to seduce the wife of the Captain of Engineering when the captain caught them in flagrante delicto. Lasalle was generous (or cautious) enough not to attack and contented himself with parrying, but he did so with such vigor that it broke the engineer's wrist. As the engineer was doubled over with fatigue and pain, Lasalle let down a hard blow with the flat edge of his sabre on the man's back. When it was obvious the engineer could take it no more, Lasalle opted to end the battle by saying, "If you had known me better you would have attached less importance to the fact you have been injured, and if I had known better, I would have refrained from continuing to fight after you had been injured. Let us finish this fight for it is far too unequal, but because of your actions I now know you are a man of honor."

This (and other) indiscretions didn't tarnish his reputation for handling light cavalry and, by 1 February 1805, he was promoted to Brigadier General. A month and a day later, he took command of the 2nd Brigade of Dragoons stationed in Amiens. He soon became sick of drilling and parades, but things changed when Napoleon set his sights on the new Austrian and Russian threats along the Rhine, sending Lasalle and his men into action.

On the Prussian Front

Lasalle went into immediate action at the Battle of Austerlitz, with the 1st Dragoon Division, under the command of Divisional General Louis Klein, in the Cavalry Reserve of Marshal Joachim Murat. Because of his successes on the field, he was given command of a Light Cavalry Brigade consisting of the 5th and 7th Hussar Regiments, also under the command of Marshal Murat. Lasalle's star was high during the 1806 campaign for Prussia, where his hussars became known as the "Brigade Infernale" ("Hellish Brigade"), with Colonels François Xavier de Schwarz and Ferdinand-Daniel Marx as his regimental commanders.

He then fought at Schleiz and Jena-Auerstedt, where he captured the King of Prussia's bodyguard and forced the Prince of Hohenlohe to retreat. On 26 October 1806, Lasalle was in pursuit of Hohenlohe when he observed Prussian infantry northwest of his position, at the edge of the forest, near Zehdenick. Unconcerned about the enemy's huge numerical superiority, he charged. After fierce fighting, the Prussians managed to beat back Lasalle's hussars until cavalry reinforcements arrived. General Grouchy arrived at about the same time and the combined attacks destroyed the Prussian cavalry. The Prussian infantry moved into the woods and then withdrew.

On 28 October, as they approached Prenzlau, they realized the Prussian Army had been inside the city for some time. Marshal Murat arrived at 10 a.m. and ordered Lasalle to cut the road from Gustow and to storm the northern gates of the city. Lasalle took his troopers right up to the city gates and burst them open. He continued on through the city and out the east gates where he could see Hohenlohe's army forming in a plain north east of the city.

Capitulation of Stettin

The next day Lasalle and his hussars marched to the fortress of Stettin, arriving well ahead of the main French force. He prepared to attack but decided to try a bluff instead. Pretending that the entire army had arrived, he demanded that Stettin surrender. General Romberg's reply was predictable:. "Tell your master that the town of Stettin was entrusted to my safeguard and that I shall defend it to my last man". Lasalle then resorted to threats: "If, by 8 a.m. you have not surrendered, the town will be bombarded by our artillery, stormed by 50,000 men, the garrison will be put to the sword and the town will be plundered during twenty-four hours".  Convinced that he was faced with 50,000 French soldiers, Romberg entered into negotiations and capitulated on the evening of 29–30 October. Over 5,000 men and 281 guns were surrendered, and Lasalle became a national hero. Napoleon wrote to Murat, "If your Light Cavalry captures fortified towns, I’ll have to discharge my Engineer Corps and have my heavy artillery melted down".

In spite of their victory, Lasalle's troops were exhausted. He later wrote: "Who could recognize the brilliant hussars from Kronach fourteen months ago, those of the 5th Regiment with their white pelisses with lemon-yellow braids and their sky-blue breeches, those of the 7th Regiment with their green pelisses with daffodil-yellow braids and their scarlet breeches? Today the whole brigade, men and horses adorned alike in mud, have neither form nor color. Their uniform is misery".

Battles of Lübeck and Golymin

The capitulation of Stettin had prevented Prussian General Blücher from passing the frontier into Eastern Pomerania. Now Blücher was determined to escape from the French at any cost. Murat, together with Lasalle, Bernadotte and Soult were in hot pursuit, forcing Blücher farther and farther to the north. Having run out of Prussian territory, On 5 November, he marched into the neutral city-state of Lübeck, where he demanded money and food from the city authorities. The next day, Bernadotte's men arrived and attacked the walls. Lasalle was among these men and fought bravely.

During the Battle of Golymin, General Lasalle led his legendary "Hellish Brigade" against a Russian battery of 12-15 guns. The hussars charged with vigor but were abruptly seized with panic, turned about and, in disorder, stampeded back to the rear. Of the whole brigade only the elite company of the 7th Hussars, placed immediately behind Lasalle himself, remained firmly at their posts. Lasalle was furious. He rode after them, screamed "Halt!", and brought them back. Lasalle kept them within a short range from the Russian guns as punishment for their behavior, standing 20 paces in front of his men, remaining motionless and calm, although under enemy fire.
He then finally rallied his troops and commanded "Break the ranks!", and with the support of Klein's dragoon division charged the enemy from the flank. The Russians were routed and fled under the cover of artillery as Lasalle pursued until the battle was won.

Promotion and cavalry trainer
On 30 December 1806, Lasalle was promoted to Divisional General and given command of the Light Cavalry Division in Murat's Cavalry Reserve. Shortly thereafter, Napoleon authorized raising a guard regiment of Polish Light Horse. Under General Lasalle they were given an intensive course in horsemanship and discipline, becoming one of the finest regiments in the Imperial Guard. An officer of the Poles wrote: "It was in Lasalle's school that we learned outpost duty. We have kept a precious memory of this general in whom all the lovable and imposing qualities of a born marshal were combined ... He should have replaced Murat to whom he was vastly superior ..."

Battle of Heilsberg

During the Battle of Heilsberg, on 12 June 1807, Murat was surrounded at the height of a mêlée by 12 Russian dragoons. Lasalle was in command of three brigades of light cavalry which contained the "Hellish Brigade", two lancer regiments, and five horse chasseur regiments. Lasalle saw Murat in trouble and charged at the enemy, killing the officer who commanded the detachment and putting 11 dragoons on the run, saving Murat's life. Shortly after, Murat and other members of the "Hellish Brigade" saved Lasalle from certain death. Afterwards, while shaking hands, Murat told Lasalle, "General, we are even". The following July, Napoleon made Lasalle a Grand Cross Knight of the Order of the Iron Crown. He was then sent to Spain under the orders of Jean-Baptiste Bessières.

The Peninsular War
Lasalle was given command of the 1st Light Cavalry Division, consisting of the 8th Hussars, 13th, 16th and 24th Chasseurs. Lasalle's cousin, Pierre-Louis-Adolphe-Georges du Prel, became his aide-de-camp. He arrived in Spain on 15 February 1808. One of Lasalle's major faults was his willingness to repay resistance with brutality, and it was said of him that he "made Spain tremble". In June, Lasalle was responsible for the torching of Torquemada, a village that resisted his troops. As his men approached Palencia, the insurgents abandoned their positions and fled to Valladolid, supported by a column of infantry.

Battling across Spain
After plundering Torquemada and ransoming the town of Palencia, Lasalle set off for Valladolid. On 11 June 1808 Lasalle's army linked up with the troops of General Merle. The following day, their combined 9,000 strong army attacked a force of 4-5,000 men under Spanish General Cuesta, deployed along the Cabezón bridge to bar the road to Burgos against oncoming French divisions. In the subsequent French attack the Spanish cavalry fled and the infantry broke, whereafter Lasalle proceeded to Valladolid, which he occupied the same night.

On 14 July at Medina de Rioseco, with 14,000 men under the command of Bessierès, he fought against over 20,000 Spaniards. Lasalle marched towards Vitoria, commanding the rearguard, and protecting the French from another breach made by the enemy. As a result of these actions, he was named Grand Officer of the Legion of Honor and made a Count of the Empire.

On 7 November he fought at the Battle of Burgos. The untrained Spanish militias were unable to form infantry squares and scattered in the face of massed French cavalry, while the stubborn Spanish and Walloon Guards stood their ground in vain. A few days later, at the Battle of Villa Viejo, he captured seven cannons and four flags. On 15 March, Leval’s division and Lasalle’s cavalry crossed the Tagus River at Talavera. On the next day they were joined by Victor-Perrin, heading Villatte’s and Ruffin’s divisions, at Arzobispo. The rest of the cavalry, along with the artillery and the baggage, was sent to Almaraz. Two days later, Lasalle reached Meza de Ibor and fought the Spanish troops, forcing them out of their defensive position on the Tagus.

Battle of Medellín

Lasalle then joined the Battle of Medellín. The Spanish had an army almost twice the size of the French. Lasalle's position was a bit dangerous, since the Guadiana River was only a mile behind his back and Lasalle recognized how dangerous a retreat would be in the close confinements of the narrow bridge. Lasalle had been reinforced with seven infantry battalions from Villatte, and once he saw the Spanish routing to the west he ordered a powerful counter-attack. Lasalle's fresh battalions also attacked frontally, and French dragoons were now rolling over the center of the Spanish army, which attempted to flee in any way it could. Cuesta's army effectively ceased to exist.

That was his last battle on the Spanish Peninsula, where he was nicknamed "Pícaro" which means "rogue" or "adventurer" in Spanish. Napoleon called 33-year-old Lasalle from Spain to Germany. Lasalle's excitement at being ordered to join Masséna’s corps in Germany was made clear by a chance meeting with Roederer and Thiébault in Burgos. To Roederer’s question if he were traveling via Paris, Lasalle replied, "Yes, it’s the shortest way. I shall arrive at 5 a.m.; I shall order a pair of boots; I shall make my wife pregnant, and I shall depart". He left immediately to take command of the Light Cavalry Division in the IV Army Corps commanded by Masséna.

Final battles in Austria

Battle of Aspern-Essling

Lasalle joined the French Army for its 1809 Campaign along the Danube. He arrived just prior to Napoleon's push across the Danube at Aspern-Essling and was sent to scout the location of the Austrian army. The first stage of the operation began on 13 May 1809, laying a bridge of boats over the first arm of the Danube to Lobau. Then, the advance guard and Lasalle's light cavalry would pass into Lobau, together with the material needed to bridge the second arm to the left bank. As soon as this was finished, Molitor’s division and Lasalle's four light cavalry regiments passed over and Lasalle's horsemen fanned out into the plain. There were no travelers or couriers to be intercepted there, as there had always been in Prussia and Spain; consequently, Lasalle's officers had nothing to go on but the evidence of their own eyes and ears.

On the morning of the 21st, great masses of men, guns and wagons had assembled on the island. In the next four hours both Aspern and Essling were taken and retaken several times. Napoleon ordered Lasalle's cavalry regiments to aid Marulaz's distressed troops, but General Liechtenstein anticipated this maneuver sending nine regiments to drive off Lasalle, engaging him frontally with four regiments and using the remaining five to charge his flank. Lasalle fought them off, buying time for the hard-pressed French infantry in Aspern.

At 7 p.m. Lasalle mustered his troops for another charge. Lasalle managed to defeat the first Habsburg line, but Austrian hussars captured quite a few men of the 24th Chasseurs. Outnumbered on the second day of battle, Napoleon ordered Lasalle and Espagne to defend a sector the IV Corps had been thrust into. Taking advantage of the fog, Lasalle's men fought along the defensive ground running between the two villages, charging the Austrians in a series of short, sharp charges intended to prevent them from launching a coordinated attack. These tactics worked, allowing General Boudet to gain complete control of Essling.

Later, during Marshal Lannes' advance, Lasalle and Marulaz's cavalry charged at least three times in an effort to support the infantry. Although the French were forced to withdraw, Lasalle's determination and courage prevented the withdrawal from becoming a rout.

Death at the Battle of Wagram

On 5 July 1809, Lasalle fought at the Battle of Wagram commanding a Light Cavalry Division in the IV Corps of Marshal Masséna. On the morning of the battle, Lasalle had a presentiment about his death. He drew up a petition to the Emperor, asking him to take care of his children, and gave it to one of his friends to deliver to Napoleon, if necessary. On the eve of the battle, opening his luggage he found his broken pipe, a bottle of liquor and a broken glass that had been used by his wife. As a result of these omens, he told his aide-de-camp, "I will not survive this day". He wrote a letter to his wife that read: "Mon coeur est à toi, mon sang à l'Empereur, ma vie à l'honneur" (My heart belongs to you, my blood to the Emperor, my life to honor).

On the night of the second day, Lasalle's men had still not been ordered to fight so Lasalle went to Marshal Masséna to ask permission to pursue the enemy. Masséna ordered him to go aid General MacDonald. Lasalle exclaimed, "The battle is almost finished and we are the only ones who have not contributed to the victory! Let’s go, follow me!" Lasalle was temporarily separated from his division and accidentally alerted a battalion of enemy infantry, so he charged them with the 1st Cuirassier Regiment. Lasalle was shot in the chest but continued to charge. The enemy infantry broke and was routed as Lasalle and regiment pursued them. As he charged, Lasalle was shot between the eyes by a Hungarian grenadier and was killed instantly. Marulaz tried to avenge Lasalle by leading a hussar regiment against a square of Austrian infantry, but was wounded in the attempt and had to be carried to the rear.

Posthumous honours

 A street in Metz was named after him.
 His portrait was placed in one of the salons of the Hotel de Ville.
 In 1891, his remains were repatriated from Austria and entombed at Les Invalides.
 In 1893, an equestrian statue of him was erected in Lunéville.
 He has a bust in the Gallery of Battles of the Palace of Versailles.
 His name is marked on a pillar of the Arc de Triomphe.
 His name is used for a cycling event in the Netherlands, the Tour de Lasalle www.tourdelasalle.nl
 He is briefly mentioned in Edgar Allan Poe's short story, The Pit and the Pendulum in which he ultimately saves a condemned main character from being executed by the Spanish Inquisition.

References

Sources
 
 Philip Haythornthwaite, Napoleon's Commanders (1): c1792-1809. (Elite, Vol.1), Osprey Publishing (2001)

Further reading
 Marcel Dupont, Le Général Lasalle, Éditions Berger-Levrault (1929), reissued by the Librairie des Deux Empires (2001) 
 François Guy Hourtoulle, Le Général Comte Charles Lasalle, 1775–1809, Copernic (1979) 

1775 births
1809 deaths
Military personnel from Metz
French generals
French military personnel of the French Revolutionary Wars
French military personnel killed in the Napoleonic Wars
Cavalry commanders
Knights of the Order of Saint Louis
French commanders of the Napoleonic Wars
Names inscribed under the Arc de Triomphe